Armchair is a Thai pop rock band formed in Bangkok. Originally, this band was called SHAKERS on the album Small Room 001. Later, they changed the name to Armchair. The members said that the name is a symbol of the relaxing music of the band.

History
Armchair consists of four young people from King Mongkut’s Institute of Technology Ladkrabang and Alumni Suankularb Wittayalai School.  Pastel Mood is their first album under Universal Music (Thailand) and by Rungrote Uppatumphowat. This album was very popular in genre bossa nova. Design is their second album. Armchair had sales landslide and have to be reproduced with a new name Re-Design. In the following year, Armchair released a new album entitled Spring. After that, Armchair has stopped creating music because one of the members went to study abroad but has created a special album by the name Tender. In 2010, they released their comeback album under Sony music Thailand. This album contains a special music to advertise and they released the first single which got the No. 1 rank in many popular radio stations.

Discography
SHAKERS
 Small Room 001
Armchair
 Pastel mood(2001)
 Design(2003)
 Spring(2004)
 Tender(2005)
 Colours In The Shadow(2008)

Songs
Armchair has released over 50 songs, with the album count at 5.

References

Thai rock music groups
Musical groups established in 2001
2001 establishments in Thailand
Musical groups from Bangkok